Casket Mountain is a summit in Alberta, Canada.

Casket Mountain was so named on account of a casket-shaped rock outcropping.

References

Two-thousanders of Alberta
Alberta's Rockies